Spring Garden is a census-designated place and unincorporated community in Cherokee County, Alabama, United States. Its population was 216 as of the 2020 census. The area was also known as Amberson or Ambersonville in the 19th century. It was erroneously called "Aubersonville" in the 1880 U.S. Census.

History
A post office has been in operation under the name Spring Garden since 1844. The community was named for an early settler who was noted for his lush annual spring garden.

Demographics

Education
Spring Garden Public Schools are part of the Cherokee County School District. Schools in the district include Cedar Bluff School, Centre Elementary School, Gaylesville School, Sand Rock School, Centre Middle School, Cherokee County High School, Spring Garden High School and Cherokee County Career & Technology Center.

Spring Garden High School is located in Spring Garden. The mission of Spring Garden High School is to prepare all students for the future, equipping them with academic skills, good work habits, marketable skills, an awareness of good health habits, and an appreciation for life. 
Girls' basketball has won the state championship four times, in 1987, 2004, 2005, and 2008. Girls' volleyball has won one state championship, in 2007. The teams have all made it to state playoffs numerous other times.
The principal of Spring Garden High School is Michael Welsh, and Cassandra Lindsey is the Administrative intern.

Mitchell Guice is the Superintendent of Schools.

References

Census-designated places in Cherokee County, Alabama
Census-designated places in Alabama